TATV (Tout Acheter Tout Vendre), previously known as Télé-Annonces, was a Canadian French language cable television channel and website owned by Astral Media broadcasting 24 hours a day classified ads from individuals and merchants. It was offered exclusively in Quebec by the cable companies Vidéotron and Cogeco.

TATV was an illustrated classified advertising service, offering individuals and businesses the means to sell goods and services via television and the Internet. TATV was primarily a regionalised service, covering 16 different regions in Quebec, each being served by a local TATV channel. The regions were:
 West of Montreal
 East of Montreal
 Laval
 South Shore of Montreal
 Montérégie
 North Shore of Montreal
 Laurentides
 Lanaudière
 Sherbrooke
 Quebec City
 Saguenay–Lac-Saint-Jean
 Granby
 Mauricie
 Drummond/Yamaska
 Gaspésie
 Outaouais
 Beauce
 Victoriaville
 Thetford Mines
 Rivière-du-Loup

TATV was classified as a shopping television service by the Canadian Radio-television and Telecommunications Commission (CRTC) and, thus, was exempt from requiring a CRTC-issued licence to operate and most other CRTC requirements that pay TV and specialty channels are subject to.

History
In 1982, Vidéotron launched Les Annonces Illustrées de Vidéotron, a specialty TV channel in illustrated classified advertising service, for individuals.

In 1987, a specialty TV channel in real estate classified advertising was launched under the name of Immeubles Télé-Vidéo, then rebranded Télé-Immeubles. In August 1996, Télé-Immeubles TV channel was added to Les Annonces Illustrées de Vidéotron TV channel. Following the combination of Télé-Immeubles and Les Annonces Illustrées de Vidéotron on a single TV channel, the channel was rebranded Télé-Classée.

In 1997, Télé-Classée was rebranded Télé-Annonces.

In November 1998, Télé-Annonces, ownership of Vidéotron, became the ownership of Radiomutuel. In January 2000, Radiomutuel was bought by Astral Media.

In response to growing popularity of online classified ad services, Télé-Annonces was rebranded TATV on June 6, 2006, repositioning itself primarily as an online service, supported by a television channel.

On August 19, 2008, Astral Media announced the immediate closure of TATV. The company stated the growing market share of classified ads using the free Internet model, coupled with the fact that classified ads are not one of the company's core businesses, were the reasons for the closure of TATV.

References

External links
Télé-Annonces official website  (from the Internet Archive Wayback Machine)
TATV official website  (from the Internet Archive Wayback Machine)

Shopping networks in Canada
Astral Media
Analog cable television networks in Canada
Defunct television networks in Canada
Television channels and stations established in 1982
Television channels and stations disestablished in 2008